Veijo is a given name. Notable people with the name include:

Veijo Baltzar (born 1942), Romani author and visual artist
Veijo-Lassi Holopainen (1921–2006), Finnish field hockey player
Veijo Kaakinen (1907–1976), Finnish sports shooter
Veijo Meri (1928–2015), Finnish writer
Veijo Mikkolainen (born 1924), Finnish rower
Veijo Niemi (born 1954), Finnish politician
Veijo Pasanen (1930–1988), Finnish actor
Veijo Puhjo (1948–2019), Finnish politician
Veijo Tahvanainen, Finnish orienteering competitor
Veijo Vannesluoma (born 1958), Finnish pole vaulter
Veijo Viinikka, Finnish darts player

Finnish masculine given names